Rugosochonetidae is an extinct family of brachiopods in the extinct order Productida.

References

External links 
 

 

Prehistoric protostome families
Brachiopod families
Productida
Devonian first appearances
Permian extinctions